The 2006 Pacific Rugby Cup was the inaugural season of the Pacific Rugby Cup. It featured 6 representative rugby union football teams; 2 from each of the three Pacific rugby unions - Fiji, Samoa and Tonga.

Savaii Samoa won the title, defeating Fiji Warriors by 10 points to 5 in the grand final.

Teams and format
The six teams that were created to take part in the competition were:

Savaii Samoa
Upolu Samoa
Fiji Warriors
Fiji Barbarians
Tau'uta Reds
Tautahi Gold

The teams played a single round robin (home or away) series. The two top-ranked teams at the end of the standings met in the grand final match, with the first-ranked team awarded home advantage.

Table
{| class="wikitable"
|-
!width=165|Team
!width=40|Played
!width=40|Won
!width=40|Drawn
!width=40|Lost
!width=40|For
!width=40|Against
!width=40|Point Difference
!width=40|Bonus Points
!width=40|Points
|- bgcolor=#ccffcc align=center
|align=left| Savaii Samoa
|5||4||0||1||120||81||+39||2||18
|- bgcolor=#ccffcc align=center
|align=left| Fiji Warriors
|5||3||1||1||112||72||+40||2||17
|- align=center
|align=left| Fiji Barbarians
|5||2||1||2||76||73||+3||2||12
|- align=center
|align=left| Tau'uta Reds 
|5||2||0||3||70||89||-19||2||10
|- align=center
|align=left| Upolu Samoa
|5||1||1||3||81||113||-32||1||7
|- align=center
|align=left| Tautahi Gold 
|5||1||1||3||62||94||-32||1||7
|}

Match results

Final

References

World Rugby Pacific Challenge
Pacific Rugby Cup
Pacific Rugby Cup
Pacific Rugby Cup
Pacific Rugby Cup
Pacific